Joshua Michael Osich (born September 3, 1988) is an American former professional baseball pitcher. He made his Major League Baseball (MLB) debut with the San Francisco Giants in 2015 and also played for the Chicago White Sox, Boston Red Sox, and Chicago Cubs. He is one of the only players in MLB history who is of Basque descent.

College career
Born and raised in Boise, Idaho, Osich graduated from Bishop Kelly High School in 2007.  He played college baseball at Oregon State University in Corvallis, but missed the 2010 season, recovering from Tommy John surgery. Despite the injury, he was selected by the Los Angeles Angels of Anaheim in the seventh round of the 2010 Major League Baseball draft. Osich did not sign and returned to Oregon State and in his final collegiate season in 2011, he threw a no-hitter against UCLA. He was then taken by the San Francisco Giants in the sixth round (207th overall) of the 2011 MLB draft and signed.

Professional career

San Francisco Giants (2015–2018)
Osich was called up to the majors for the first time on July 3, 2015, pitching one scoreless inning of relief against the Washington Nationals.  On July 11, 2015, Osich earned his first major league win in his fifth relief appearance, pitching  of an inning against the Philadelphia Phillies.  Osich didn't allow a hit until his eighth major league appearance.  Osich was optioned to Triple-A Sacramento on July 22, 2015.  Osich was recalled to the Giants on August 7, 2015, when pitcher Mike Leake was put on the DL.  In 2015, Osich appeared in 35 games, recording a 2.20 ERA with 27 strikeouts in 28 innings pitched.

In 2016, Osich was named to the opening day Major League roster for the Giants. On July 28, Osich was placed on DL. He finished the season appearing in 59 games, posting an ERA of 4.71 in  innings. Osich posted an ERA of 6.23 in 54 games in 2017, with 43 strikeouts in  innings. He began the 2018 season in the bullpen before being placed on the disabled list on April 20. He was sent to the minors on May 25. He ended the season having appeared in 12 games, with an 8.25 ERA. Osich was designated for assignment on February 12, 2019, following the acquisition of Jose Lopez.

Baltimore Orioles
On February 19, 2019, Osich was claimed off waivers by the Baltimore Orioles. He was designated for assignment on March 8, 2019, following the acquisition of Dwight Smith Jr.

Chicago White Sox (2019)
On March 11, 2019, Osich was claimed off waivers by the Chicago White Sox. Osich appeared in 57 games (all in relief) with the 2019 White Sox, recording a 4–0 record with a 4.66 ERA while striking out 61 batters in  innings pitched.

Boston Red Sox (2020)
On October 31, 2019, Osich was claimed off waivers by the Boston Red Sox. He was non-tendered on December 2, 2019, and became a free agent. On December 4, Osich re-signed with Boston on a one-year major league contract. He made his debut for the Red Sox in the team's second game of the delayed-start 2020 season, pitching a scoreless inning in relief on July 25. With the 2020 Red Sox, Osich compiled a 1–1 record in 13 appearances totaling  innings pitched with a 5.74 ERA.

Chicago Cubs (2020)
On August 31, 2020, Osich was traded to the Chicago Cubs in exchange for Zach Bryant. With the 2020 Chicago Cubs, Osich appeared in 4 games, compiling a 0-0 record with 10.13 ERA and 4 strikeouts in 2.2 innings pitched. On September 30, 2020, Osich was designated for assignment by the Cubs shortly before their Wild Card matchup against the Miami Marlins.

Cincinnati Reds (2021)
On December 21, 2020, Osich signed a minor league contract with the Cincinnati Reds organization. On June 19, 2021, Osich was selected to the active roster. In 17 appearances for the Reds, Osich posted a 5.02 ERA with 9 strikeouts. On July 11, 2021, Osich recorded his only MLB save by pitching the final inning of a 3-1 Reds victory over the Brewers.       On July 28, Osich was designated for assignment by the Reds. He elected free agency on July 30.

On May 16, 2022, Osich announced his retirement from professional baseball via Instagram.

References

External links

1988 births
Living people
Sportspeople from Boise, Idaho
Baseball players from Idaho
Major League Baseball pitchers
San Francisco Giants players
Chicago White Sox players
Boston Red Sox players
Chicago Cubs players
Cincinnati Reds players
Oregon State Beavers baseball players
San Jose Giants players
Richmond Flying Squirrels players
Sacramento River Cats players
Charlotte Knights players
Louisville Bats players